William Benjamin Clarke (5 November 1846 – 18 August 1902) was an English cricketer.  He was a right-handed batsman who bowled right-arm medium-fast.

He and his wife Hannah had two daughters Alice and Amelia and two sons William and Charles (who played three times for Sussex in 1902). Clarke died in Hyson Green, Nottingham in 1902 aged 55.

External links
 CricketArchive
 Profile of W.B. Clarke by Don Ambrose

1846 births
1902 deaths
English cricketers
Middlesex cricketers
Nottinghamshire cricketers
Cricketers from Nottingham
North v South cricketers